Royale II was an 80-foot waterline length catamaran that was sailed across the Atlantic ocean in 1986.

See also
 List of multihulls

References

Individual catamarans
1980s sailing yachts